Mokre  is a village in the administrative district of Gmina Dąbrowa, within Mogilno County, Kuyavian-Pomeranian Voivodeship, in north-central Poland.

In 2007 the village had a population of 380.

References

Mokre